The , or Trial against the Jews of Trent, was an unpublished manuscript describing the trial and execution of 18 Jews from Trent, Italy, for the murder of Simon of Trent in 1475. Commissioned in the 1470s, it came into the possession of a convent in Vienna in the 17th century and remained there until 1937, when it was purchased at auction by Lessing J. Rosenwald in order to avoid the document falling into the hands of the Nazis and being used to justify anti-semitism. After being sealed for 50 years, it was auctioned and now resides in Yeshiva University.

Origins and history 
The  was written some time between 20 June 1478 and 1479 as a commission by either Eberhard I, Duke of Württemberg or his brother-in-law, Francesco Gonzaga. Whoever was responsible for it, the work features the arms of the Dukes of Württemberg, and consists of 614 illuminated folios. In 1615 it was acquired by a convent in Vienna, where it remained until the Great Depression in the  1930s, when it was auctioned.

It came up for auction in December 1937, when it drew the attention of the Jewish-American businessman and bibliomane Lessing J. Rosenwald. Rosenwald was certain that, should the manuscript be obtained by the Nazi German administration, it would be used to justify anti-Semitism, and insisted that his auction agent spend whatever amount of money was necessary to secure it. This was done, with one of the outbid auction attendees later discovered to be an agent of the German government. As soon as the work arrived in the United States, Rosenwald shipped it to the American Jewish Historical Society, mandating that it be sealed and hidden for 50 years. When this time period expired, the Society auctioned the manuscript for $176,000 to Erica and Ludwig Jesselson, a pair of Jewish cultural collectors and patrons. The manuscript was then donated to Yeshiva University in 1988, where it remains. In 1992 it was used as a resource by R. Po-Chia Hsia, a European history professor, to author the book Trent 1475: Stories of a Ritual Murder Trial and contribute to scholarship around the trials in Trent.

Contents 
The Prozess is not a complete copy of the trial proceedings, as it was commissioned during the campaign to secure Simon of Trent's status as a Catholic Saint; it contains only selected documents.

To legitimise the work, it begins with the papal bull of Pope Sixtus IV that validated the trial, translated into German. It then provides a chronological prologue, describing the disappearance of Simon, the discovery of the corpse and the first arrests, before focusing on the trial proceedings, particularly the interrogations. The author of the document is believed to be either Hans von Fundo, the scribe of the criminal court, or Peter Rauter of Malefarrat – identifying distinct voices and a particular author is rendered difficult by the variety of languages used during the interrogations, including German, Hebrew and Italian.

References

Bibliography 

1470s books
Antisemitism in Italy
Blood libel
15th-century manuscripts